Elm Tree Beacon Light served as the front range with New Dorp Light as the rear to mark Swash Channel. The channel is now marked by Staten Island Light and West Bank Light.

References

External links
 Lighthouse Friends site
 

Lighthouses completed in 1856
Lighthouses completed in 1939
Lighthouses in Staten Island